Summitville is an unincorporated community in Coffee County, Tennessee, United States. Summitville has a post office with ZIP code 37382, which opened on June 5, 1877. The Crouch-Ramsey Family Farm, which is listed on the National Register of Historic Places, is located near Summitville.

Notable residents
Bennett H. Henderson, U.S. Representative for Tennessee

References

Unincorporated communities in Coffee County, Tennessee
Unincorporated communities in Tennessee